The  visa policy of Turkey deals with the requirements that a foreign national wishing to enter Turkey must meet to be permitted to travel to, enter and remain in the country.

Visitors to Turkey must obtain a visa from one of the Turkish diplomatic missions unless they come from one of the 91 visa-exempt countries and territories or one of the 28 countries and territories whose citizens are eligible to apply for an electronic visa. Turkish visas are documents issued by the Ministry of Foreign Affairs and its subsequent diplomatic missions abroad with the stated goal of regulating and facilitating migratory flows.

Visitors of most nationalities must hold a passport valid for no less than 150 days from the date of arrival. The passport validity requirement does not apply to citizens of Belgium, France, Luxembourg, Portugal, Spain, and Switzerland who can enter with a passport expired for less than five years, citizens of Germany who can enter with a passport or an ID card expired for less than one year, citizens of Bulgaria who are only required to have a passport valid for their period of stay. An identity card is accepted instead of a passport for citizens of Azerbaijan, Belgium, Bosnia and Herzegovina, Bulgaria, France, Georgia, Germany, Greece, Hungary, Italy, Liechtenstein, Luxembourg, Malta, Moldova, Netherlands, Northern Cyprus, Poland, Portugal, Serbia, Spain, Switzerland and Ukraine. The validity period requirement also does not apply to nationals of countries whose identity cards are accepted.

Even though Turkey is a candidate country for membership of the European Union, it has a more complex visa policy than the visa policy of the Schengen Area. Turkey requires visas from citizens of one EU member state (the Republic of Cyprus), as well as Schengen Annex II countries and territories – Antigua and Barbuda, Australia, Bahamas, Barbados, Canada, Dominica, East Timor, Grenada, Kiribati, Marshall Islands, Mauritius, Mexico, Micronesia, Palau, Saint Lucia, Saint Vincent and the Grenadines, Samoa, Solomon Islands, Taiwan, Tonga, Tuvalu, United Arab Emirates and United States. However, citizens of most of these countries can obtain electronic visas. On the other hand, Turkey grants visa-free access to citizens of other countries and territories – Azerbaijan, Belarus, Belize, Bolivia, Ecuador, Indonesia, Iran, Kosovo, Kyrgyzstan, Jordan, Lebanon, Mongolia, Morocco, Qatar, Russia, Tajikistan, Thailand, Tunisia and Uzbekistan.

The Turkish government announced that effective from 2 March 2020, visas are not required for passport holders from the following countries: Austria, Belgium, Croatia, Republic of Ireland, Malta, Netherlands, Norway, Poland, Portugal, Spain and the United Kingdom.

Visa policy map

Visa free access 

Citizens of the following countries and territories who hold ordinary passports do not require a visa to visit Turkey for the durations described below for tourism or business purposes (unless otherwise stated). For visits of up to 90 days within 180 days, an identity card is accepted instead of a passport for citizens of some countries.

 
Conditionavisa-freeee access

 and  signed visa-free agreement which is yet to be ratified.

Non-ordinary passport holders 
Under reciprocal agreements, holders of diplomatic or service passports or laissez-passers issued by the following jurisdictions are allowed to enter and remain in Turkey for up to 90 days in 180 days (unless otherwise noted)

  (UN) Laissez-Passer holders who have blue UN travel documents shall be exempted from entry visa requirement for their official visits to Turkey for up to 90 days in 180 days if they can certify their official assignment. Otherwise, general visa provisions shall apply. Red UN Travel Document holders, shall be exempted from entry visa and may stay in Turkey for 90 days within the preceding 180 days regardless of their purpose of visit.

Electronic Visas (e-Visa) 
Holders of passports from the following 29 countries and territories can apply and obtain an electronic visa (e-Visa) for a fee before arrival. The duration of stay for most of these nationalities is up to 90 days (up to 30 days for some) within 180 days.

Conditional e-Visa 
Citizens of these countries and territories are eligible to apply for a single entry e-Visa on which they can stay for up to 30 days only if meeting the conditions listed below:

1 – e-Visas are issued free of charge.

Sticker visa required in advance without an exception 
Citizens of the following countries and territories are not eligible for any of the “Visa Free Access”, “Electronic Visa” or “Conditional Electronic Visa” schemes. Therefore they have to obtain the appropriate type of visa for their intended visits in advance at a Turkish diplomatic mission:

Visitor statistics 

Turkey issued 16,199,968 electronic visas between April 2013 and January 1, 2017. The acceptance rate was 87.79% as 18,452,733 applications were filed in this period. Most visas were issued to nationals of the United Kingdom (4.6 million), Iraq (2 million) and the Netherlands (1.8 million).

See also 

 Visa requirements for Turkish citizens
 Visa policy of Northern Cyprus
 Visa policy of the Schengen Area

Notes

References

External links 
 Turkish E-Visa Government Official Website
 Turkish Sticker-type visa application
 Go Turkiye-Turkish Official Tourism Website

Foreign relations of Turkey
Turkey